This is a list of capital cities of sovereign states that share a border with another sovereign state.

Current capitals

See also
 :Category:Capitals for other lists of capitals

References

Lists of capitals